The 1999 Southeastern Conference baseball tournament was held at Hoover Metropolitan Stadium in Hoover, Alabama from May 19 through 23. Alabama defeated  in the championship game, earning the Southeastern Conference's automatic bid to the 1999 NCAA Division I baseball tournament.

Regular Season Results
The top four teams (based on conference results) from both the Eastern and Western Divisions earned invites to the tournament.

Tournament

Florida, Georgia, Tennessee, and Vanderbilt did not make the tournament.

All-Tournament Team
Most Valuable Player
G.W. Keller, Alabama

See also
College World Series
NCAA Division I Baseball Championship
Southeastern Conference baseball tournament

References

SECSports.com All-Time Baseball Tournament Results
SECSports.com All-Tourney Team Lists

Tournament
Southeastern Conference Baseball Tournament
Southeastern Conference baseball tournament
Southeastern Conference baseball tournament
College sports tournaments in Alabama
Baseball competitions in Hoover, Alabama